Pontarsais is a village in Carmarthenshire, Wales  north of Carmarthen and  miles northwest of Cardiff (Caerdydd).

In 2014 powerline route options were being discussed.

See also

List of places in Carmarthenshire

References

Villages in Carmarthenshire